The Jeptha Hayman House, also known as Hayman Farm, is a historic home in Kingston, Somerset County, Maryland, United States. It is a two-story, five-bay weatherboard frame dwelling in the Greek Revival style. The oldest portion is dated by an inscribed brick to 1836, with an addition from about 1850. It features a Tuscan-columned porch supported on a rusticated concrete block knee wall.

The house was listed on the National Register of Historic Places in 1990.

References

External links
, including photo from 1990, at Maryland Historical Trust

Houses in Somerset County, Maryland
Houses on the National Register of Historic Places in Maryland
Houses completed in 1836
Greek Revival houses in Maryland
National Register of Historic Places in Somerset County, Maryland